John Brockway may refer to:

John H. Brockway (1801–1870), U.S. Representative from Connecticut
John Brockway (swimmer) (1928–2009), Welsh competitive swimmer